NH 13 may refer to:

 National Highway 13 (India)
 New Hampshire Route 13, United States